René Lorain (19 March 1900 – 25 October 1984) was a French sprint runner. He competed at the 1920 Summer Olympics in the 100 m, 200 m and 4×100 metre relay events and won a silver medal in the relay; he failed to reach the finals in his individual events. Lorain won the national 100 m title in 1920 and finished second in 200 m in 1920 and 1923.

References

1900 births
1984 deaths
French male sprinters
Olympic silver medalists for France
Athletes (track and field) at the 1920 Summer Olympics
Olympic athletes of France
Sportspeople from Reims
Medalists at the 1920 Summer Olympics
Olympic silver medalists in athletics (track and field)
20th-century French people